Radosław Kursa (born 12 January 1989 in Puławy) is a Polish footballer who plays as a defender for Polish IV liga side Świdniczanka Świdnik.

Career

Club
In July 2009, he was loaned to Motor Lublin on a one-year deal.

In February 2011, he was loaned to Wisła Płock on a half-year deal.

On 19 January 2017, Kursa signed a one and a half year contract with III liga club Motor Lublin.

References

External links
 
 
 

1989 births
Living people
People from Puławy
Sportspeople from Lublin Voivodeship
Polish footballers
Association football defenders
Widzew Łódź players
Motor Lublin players
Wisła Płock players
Zagłębie Sosnowiec players
KS Lublinianka players
MKS Kluczbork players
Ekstraklasa players
I liga players
II liga players
III liga players
IV liga players